Fort Ramon Magsaysay, also known as Fort Magsaysay Military Reservation (FMMR) and Fort Mag, is the largest military reservation in the Philippines, and is a key training area of the Philippine Armed Forces. Fort Magsaysay straddles the provinces of Nueva Ecija and Aurora, encompassing Palayan City, Sta. Rosa, Gen. Tinio, Laur, and Dingalan.

History

Creation 
On December 10, 1955, President Ramon Magsaysay enacted the  base centered in Laur, Palayan.  The reservation covers portions of the provinces of Nueva Ecija, Bulacan, and Aurora.  The reservation is to be used for military training and live-fire exercises.

In its infancy Fort Magsaysay hosted the Army Training Command (ATC) which provided basic training for enlisted personnel and officers and advanced training in some specialties such as infantry and artillery.

As one of the main training grounds of the Philippine Army, Fort Magsaysay hosted the Training and Doctrine Command (TRADOC) a couple of times in its history.  Currently, TRADOC is located in Camp O'Donnell, but majority of the field exercises are conducted in Fort Magsaysay.

Martial law 
During Martial Law, Senators Jose W. Diokno, the father of human rights and Ninoy Aquino, the father of the future 15th Pres. Benigno "Noynoy" Aquino were incarcerated in Fort Magsaysay for exactly thirty days after Marcos declared martial law on September 21, 1972. It is now called the Aquino-Diokno Memorial and is home to the AFP Center for Human Rights.

Recent history 
In 1991, Mt. Pinatubo's eruption led to the Philippine government to relocate some of the residents of the volcano and Fort Magsaysay was one of the relocation sites.  Almost two decades later, the Philippine Army remains in conflict with tenant farmers, as the latter have been ordered evicted from the military reservation.

Fort Magsaysay's vast tracts of land has time and again attracted a number of claimants, without escaping controversy.  In some occasions, illegal loggers have found their way into the reservation.

On September 21, 2012, President Benigno S. Aquino III led the observance of the 40th anniversary by opening the Aquino-Diokno Memorial, the Armed Forces of the Philippines (AFP) Center for Human Rights Dialogue inside Fort Magsaysay and the museum-replica of the 1973 detention facility of Ninoy (Codenamed: Alpha) and Diokno (Codenamed: Delta).

At present, Fort Magsaysay, along with the Crow Valley Range Complex in Tarlac, provides the Armed Forces of the Philippines and allied nations ample training grounds in modern jungle warfare in large unit formation.  The RP-US 2009 Balikatan exercises commenced at Fort Magsaysay. The fort is one of the five bases where US troops and supplies could be stationed under a security deal with the Philippine and US governments.

Fort Magsaysay currently hosts the Mega Drug Abuse Treatment and Rehabilitation Center which was donated by Chinese businessman Huang Rulun after the election of President Rodrigo Duterte in 2016.  Portable modular buildings were used, with the DND allocating the land within Fort Magsaysay for the project.  The rehab center which is designed to house 10,000 patients has received much criticism from the opposition and various sectors of society.  As of 2017 it only received 311 patients.  The Department of Health in July 2020 used the Mega Rehab Center as a quarantine facilities for the COVID-19 pandemic.

In 2020, Fort Magsaysay received a budget of P273 million from the DND-DPWH Convergence Program on Strengthening and Expanding Military Readiness for National Security and Development otherwise known as Tatag ng Imprastraktura para sa Kapayapaan at Seguridad (TIKAS) (Stable Infrastructure for Peace and Security) program.  This entails constructions, renovation, and refurbishment of facilities in military camps around the country.  The project includes construction of a new headquarters for the 7th Infantry Division, a 7.3 km road, barracks and transient facilities for the Light Reaction Regiment and Special Forces units, as well as hangar facilities for the Army Aviation Battalion.

Description
Fort Magsaysay can be reached through the Bangad-Fort Magsaysay Road or through the Sta. Rosa-Fort Magsasay Road.

The original 73,000-hectare military reservation has been reduced to 35,000 hectares after seven presidential proclamations.  Despite this reduction, the sprawling base reaches all the way to the Pacific Ocean, over the Sierra Madre Mountains, with 12 kilometers of coastline.

Fort Magsaysay is also the only Philippine Army base that boast its own runway, apron, aircraft maintenance, and air control facilities.  The Philippine Army operates Cessna CE172 Skyhawk and CE421 from Fort Magsaysay.

Fort Magsaysay also has its own Rest & Recreation facility called Pahingahan Complex.  ("Pahingahan" is the Filipino word for "a place of rest.")  The R&R facility is located on the shores of a man-made lake in the base.  Soldiers and tourists can also enjoy kayaking and hiking in the nearby trails. Fort Magsaysay is located in Northwest Luzon central of Manila. Its abundance of tropical fruits, vegetation and crops of rice facilitates military personnel among those are chickens used for cockfighting events and food delivery. The choice of transportation are mainly jeepneys, tricycle, motor vehicles and carabao. It is a gateway for rest and lively entertainment.

Modernization 
The Department of National Defense's plans to expand and modernize the Philippine Army, Fort Magsaysay has been designated as the AFP's National Training Center (NTC).  The NTC's mission is to upgrade and train at battalion level.  In a period of 6 years, more than 72 Army Battalions and 12 Marine Battalions have gone through the NTC's program at Fort Magsaysay.

The fort acquired a fleet of trucks and ambulances worth P98.3 million on May 23, 2016.

Facilities
 Fort Magsaysay Airfield 
 Fort Magsaysay Army Station Hospital (FMASH)
 650 m firing range
 500 m firing range
 150 m firing range
 100 m firing range
 1.6 km runway & apron
 Officer's Club
 Batis
 Church
 Headquarters
 Stockade
 Army Store
 R&R Facilities (Pahingahan Complex)
 Aquino Diokno Shrine
 Golf Course
 Pahingahan Dam
 Gym
 AFP Transient Facilities

Gallery

See also
 Crow Valley Range Complex

References

External links 

 Training and Doctrine Command
 7ID Facilities
 Army Aviation Battalion (PA)

Magsaysay
Magsaysay
Magsaysay
Magsaysay
Detention centers during the Marcos dictatorship